Madeline von Foerster (born in San Francisco) is an American artist who resides in Germany.

Biography
To create her unique paintings, Madeline von Foerster uses a five century-old mixed technique of oil and egg tempera, developed by the Flemish Renaissance Masters.  Although linked stylistically to the past, her paintings are urgently relevant to the Anthropocene, exploring the human relationship to nature with such themes as deforestation, wildlife trafficking, and human-caused extinction.

Von Foerster's artworks are in public and private collections around the world and have been featured in numerous publications, including "100 Painters of Tomorrow" (Thames and Hudson, 2014), and an eight-page feature in Germany's "Art" Magazine.  She was also the subject of a television portrait on ARTE's "Metropolis," broadcast in Germany and France. Born in San Francisco, she studied art in California, Germany and Austria. After fifteen years in New York City, she now resides in Germany with her husband.

Solo exhibitions
2011: The Golden Toad, Roq La Rue Gallery, Seattle
2010: Reliquaries, Strychnin Gallery, Berlin
2008: Waldkammer, Strychnin Gallery, Berlin
2006: Desires Distilled, Fuse Gallery, Manhattan, NY

Collections of Note

Public Collections 

 Whatcom Museum, Bellingham, WA
 QCC Art Gallery, City University of New York

Notable Private Collections 

 Guillermo del Torro, Filmmaker
 Mark Parker, CEO, Nike
 John Zorn, Composer

References

1973 births
20th-century American painters
21st-century American painters
California College of the Arts alumni
Living people
American women painters
20th-century American women artists
21st-century American women artists